Nesalce is a village in the municipality of Bujanovac, Serbia. According to the 2002 census, the town has a population of 1203 people. Of these, 1194 (99,25 %) were ethnic Albanians, and 4 (0,33 %) others.

References

Populated places in Pčinja District
Albanian communities in Serbia